is a Japanese cross-country skier. She competed in two events at the 2006 Winter Olympics.

References

External links
 

1978 births
Living people
Japanese female cross-country skiers
Olympic cross-country skiers of Japan
Cross-country skiers at the 2006 Winter Olympics
Sportspeople from Yamagata Prefecture
Asian Games medalists in cross-country skiing
Cross-country skiers at the 2003 Asian Winter Games
Asian Games silver medalists for Japan
Medalists at the 2003 Asian Winter Games
21st-century Japanese women